The Oropesa District is one of the twelve districts in the Quispicanchi Province in Peru. Its capital is the town of Oropesa.

Geography 
Other mountains are listed below:

 Maransirayuq
 Pachatusan
 Quri Qalla
 Quriwayrachina
 Sinchi Q'umirniyuq
 Waypun

See also 
 T'anta Raymi

References 
  Instituto Nacional de Estadística e Informática. Departamento Cusco. Retrieved on November 2, 2007.

Specific